Whitehall, Maryland may refer to:
Whitehall (Annapolis, Maryland), a plantation house in Annapolis listed on the National Register of Historic Places
Whitehall, Dorchester County, Maryland, an unincorporated community in Dorchester County

See also
White Hall, Maryland (disambiguation)